William Schwartz may refer to:

 William Schwartz (law professor) (born 1933), American law professor and corporate director
 William Schwartz (physician) (1922–2009), nephrologist
 William Bernstein Schwartz Jr. (1922–2010), American businessman and United States Ambassador to the Bahamas
 William C. Schwartz (1927–2000), civic leader in Central Florida and laser industry pioneer
 William J. Schwartz (born 1950), American neurologist and professor
 William S. Schwartz (1896–1977), American artist